A. M. Nandakumar is an Indian film director and screenwriter who has worked on Tamil films. He made his debut with the 2003 action drama film, Thennavan starring Vijaykanth and Kiran Rathod.

Career
After working as an assistant director for several years to P. Vasu and Manivannan, Nandakumar successfully pitched the story of Kodiesvaran to producer K. T. Kunjumon. After initially considering either Vijay or Ajith Kumar for the lead role, the team went ahead with the producer's son, Eby Kunjumon. The film started production in 1997 with Eby appearing alongside Simran, with Hindi actress Karisma Kapoor making a guest appearance in an item number. The film's music album and trailer were released in early 1999, but Kunjumon's financial troubles meant that the film failed to have a theatrical release. If released, the film would have been among the highest budgeted films of the time. As the film became stuck, Nandakumar worked on a Japanese film titled Dancing with Ninja shot in Chennai.

Nandakumar moved on and worked on another script titled Aasan. He approached Vijayakanth to work on the film, but during the narration, it became clear that the script had been already pitched to the actor as Ramana by AR Murugadoss. Following the confusion, Vijayakanth apologetically called Nandakumar to make another film with him titled Thennavan (2003). The film opened to mixed reviews, with a critic from The Hindu noting "Thennavan would have been a tailor made story for Vijayakanth but for the flawed script, clichéd dialogue and unappealing caricatures. Somewhere down the line everyone from the director (M. Nandakumaran) and the hero seem to have lost interest."

Nandakumar announced Jambhavan (2006) in December 2005 and began production shortly after a launch event held in Tirupathi. Prashanth was signed to play the lead role, while Nila and Meghna Naidu were signed to portray the film's lead heroines. The team began shoot with a thirty-day schedule in Tenkasi in Southern Tamil Nadu. The making of the film was disrupted in January 2006, when actress Nila briefly walked out of the film after falling out with the producers. The film opened in September 2006 and received predominantly negative reviews. A critic from Sify.com noted "this film is a slapdash enterprise that will make you groan", adding "it caters strictly to B and C class audiences and leaves you cold". Another reviewer noted the similarity to Baashha (1995) adding "the quality of these remakes has ranged from entertaining to outright bad and Prashanth's Jaambavan unfortunately comes in at the lower end of that scale." Indiaglitz.com also noted the similarity adding "director Nandakumar has taken cue from a few 'mass films', but just has not managed to cobble them with any sense of purpose."

In 2014, Nandakumar made Kalkandu and the film gained media attention prior to release, owing to the lead actor Gajesh's debut. The actor was the son of actor-dancer Anand Babu and grandson of comedian Nagesh. Following the appearance of late actor Nagesh's animation in Kochadaiiyaan (2014), Nandakumar insisted on having a sequence in his film, where all three generations of the family appear in one scene through computer imagery. The film was shot mainly in Tamil Nadu, in places such as Tiruchi and Kanyakumari. The film had a limited release in October 2014, owing to the presence of bigger budget films at the box office. It opened to mixed reviews with a critics noting the film "gets stuck towards average." Another reviewer noted that the film had a dated feel and called it "excruciatingly long".

Filmography

References

Living people
20th-century Indian film directors
Tamil film directors
Year of birth missing (living people)
Tamil screenwriters